The 1987 Colorado Buffaloes football team represented the University of Colorado at Boulder in the Big Eight Conference during the 1987 NCAA Division I-A football season. Led by sixth-year head coach Bill McCartney, Colorado finished the regular season at 7–4 (4–3 in Big 8, fourth), but did not receive a bowl invitation.

Schedule

Roster

Game summaries

Washington State

Attendance: 43,527
COL: Culbertson 25 FG
WSU: Swinton 13 Rosenbach (Adams kick)
COL: Culbertson 27 FG
COL: Pruitt 18 Interception (Culbertson kick)
COL: Flannigan 3 Run (kick failed)
WSU: Adams 32 FG
WSU: Leighton 16 Rosenbach (Adams kick)
COL: Aunese 22 Run (Hannah kick)
Passing: WSU Rosenbach 26/52, 264 Yds, 2 TD, 2 INT, COL Aunese 1/3, 30 Yds
Rushing: WSU Rosenbach 15/34, COL Aunese 22/185, TD
Receiving: WSU Broussard 8/55, COL Bieniemy 1/30

References

External links
Sports-Reference – 1987 Colorado Buffaloes

Colorado
Colorado Buffaloes football seasons
Colorado Buffaloes football